The ringneck blenny (Parablennius pilicornis) is a species of combtooth blenny widespread in coastal waters of Eastern Atlantic from Spain and Portugal to Möwe Bay, Namibia, in the Mediterranean Sea from Morocco, Algeria, Spain. In the Southwest Atlantic it is found near Brazil and Patagonia, Argentina. Also in Western Indian Ocean from Natal to Knysna in South Africa.  This species reaches a length of  SL. It is the type species of the genus Parablennius

References

External links
 

ringneck blenny
Fauna of Socotra
Fauna of Oman
Fish of the Atlantic Ocean
Fish of the Mediterranean Sea
Marine fauna of West Africa
Marine fish of South Africa
Fish of South America
Fish of Brazil
Fish of Argentina
ringneck blenny
Taxa named by Georges Cuvier